Estádio Nabi Abi Chedid, also known as Nabizão, is a football (soccer) stadium in Bragança Paulista, São Paulo state, Brazil. The stadium holds 17,724 people. It was built in 1949. The stadium is owned by Red Bull Bragantino, and its formal name honors Nabi Abi Chedid, who was the father of president of Bragantino Marco Antônio Abi Chedid, and a former president of the club. It was previously named Estádio Marcelo Stéfani, its former name honored Marcelo Stéfani, who was a player, and a president of Bragantino. As Estádio Marcelo Stéfani, the stadium was also known by the nickname Marcelão.

History

The stadium was built in 32 days, after a popular movement led by the club's president Nabi Abi Chedid. It was initially named Estádio Parque das Pedras, then just Estádio das Pedras. The inaugural match was played in 1949, when Bragantino beat Mogina of Campinas 2–1. The first goal of the stadium was scored by Bragantino's Sacadura.

The stadium's attendance record currently stands at 15,000 people, set on August 26, 1990 when Bragantino and Novorizontino drew 1–1. This match was one of the legs of the Campeonato Paulista final of that year.

The second leg of the Campeonato Brasileiro Série A final between Bragantino and São Paulo was played on June 9, 1991 at the stadium. The match ended in a 0–0 draw, and São Paulo won the championship. The match attendance was 12,492 people, which is the lowest attendance ever in a Campeonato Brasileiro final.

The stadium was renamed to Estádio Nabi Abi Chedid on January 6, 2009. It was formerly named Estádio Marcelo Stéfani. The name change was badly received by the Bragança Paulista population.

References

External links
 Templos do Futebol

Football venues in São Paulo (state)
Estadio Nabi Abi Chedid
Sports venues in São Paulo (state)